Ninde, or Labo (also Nide, Meaun, Mewun) is an Oceanic language spoken by about 1,100 people in the Southwest Bay area of Malekula island, in Vanuatu.

One unusual feature is that it has both a voiced and a voiceless bilabial trill.

In popular culture
In an episode of the British television programme An Idiot Abroad, Karl Pilkington meets the chief of a local tribe, who comments upon the Ninde language.  He explains that “all the words of Ninde begin with /n/”, such as the word nimdimdip for palm tree, naho for fruit, or nuhuli for leaf.  They then visit the grave of a woman who was named Nicola.

However, this general statement is actually not true. The only words of Ninde that start with /n/ are the inanimate common nouns of the language; the /n/ reflects an old nominal article which has been fused to the radical of these common nouns. As for the name Nicola, which is a borrowed European name, it cannot be taken as representative of the Ninde language.

External links 
 Materials on Ninde are included in a number of collections held by Paradisec.
ELAR collection: Ninde documentation and orthographic design project deposited by Caroline Crouch

Notes

References
 Lynch, John and Crowley, Terry. 2001. Languages of Vanuatu: A New Survey and Bibliography. Pacific Linguistics. Canberra: Australian National University.

Malekula languages
Languages of Vanuatu
Vulnerable languages